Ereunetea is a genus of moths in the family Geometridae described by Warren in 1899.

Species
 Ereunetea fulgida Warren, 1899
 Ereunetea fulgida Warren, 1899
 Ereunetea minor (Holland, 1893)
 Ereunetea reussi (Gaede, 1914)

References

Geometridae